Miranda is one of the 23 municipalities (municipios) that makes up the Venezuelan state of Mérida and, according to a 2007 population estimate by the National Institute of Statistics of Venezuela, the municipality has a population of 22,879.  The town of Timotes is the shire town of the Miranda Municipality.  The municipality is one of several in Venezuela named Miranda Municipality after the Venezuelan revolutionary and independence hero Francisco de Miranda.

See also
Timotes
Mérida
Municipalities of Venezuela

References

External links
miranda-merida.gob.ve 

Municipalities of Mérida (state)